Clarence Franklin "Lefty" Hopper (May 27, 1874 in Jersey City, New Jersey – September 27, 1959 in San Diego) was an American pitcher in Major League Baseball. He played in two games for the Brooklyn Bridegrooms during the 1898 season.

External links

1874 births
1959 deaths
Major League Baseball pitchers
Brooklyn Bridegrooms players
Baseball players from Jersey City, New Jersey